First African Baptist Church is a historic church at 901 5th Avenue in Columbus, Georgia.

It was built in 1915 and added to the National Register in 1980. The First Baptist Church of Columbus was key in the construction.

It is featured on the Black Heritage Trail.

References

Baptist churches in Georgia (U.S. state)
Churches on the National Register of Historic Places in Georgia (U.S. state)
Gothic Revival church buildings in Georgia (U.S. state)
Churches completed in 1915
20th-century Baptist churches in the United States
Churches in Columbus, Georgia
National Register of Historic Places in Muscogee County, Georgia
First African Baptist churches